SET domain containing 2 is an enzyme that in humans is encoded by the SETD2 gene.

Function 
SETD2 protein is a histone methyltransferase that is specific for lysine-36 of histone H3, and methylation of this residue is associated with active chromatin. This protein also contains a novel transcriptional activation domain and has been found associated with hyperphosphorylated RNA polymerase II.

The trimethylation of lysine-36 of histone H3 (H3K36me3) is required in human cells for homologous recombinational repair and genome stability.  Depletion of SETD2 increases the frequency of deletion mutations that arise by the alternative DNA repair process of microhomology-mediated end joining.

Clinical significance 
The SETD2 gene is located on the short arm of chromosome 3 and has been shown to play a tumour suppressor role in human cancer.

Interactions 

SETD2 has been shown to interact with Huntingtin. Huntington's disease (HD), a neurodegenerative disorder characterized by loss of striatal neurons, is caused by an expansion of a polyglutamine tract in the HD protein huntingtin. SETD2 belongs to a class of huntingtin interacting proteins characterized by WW motifs.

References

Further reading